Qiajivik Mountain is a mountain in Qikiqtaaluk, Nunavut, Canada. Located in northeastern Baffin Island, it is part of the Baffin Mountains. At  Qiajivik is the highest mountain in northern Baffin Island and with a topographic prominence of  it is one of Canada's 142 ultra prominent peaks.

See also
 Mountain peaks of Canada
 List of Ultras of North America

References

External links
 "Qiajivik Mountain, Nunavut" on Peakbagger

Arctic Cordillera
Mountains of Baffin Island
One-thousanders of Nunavut